RTTNews was founded in the U.S. in the late 1990s by Andrew Mariathasan  as a financial news provider. 

The newswire carries corporate news and economic news, market commentaries, corporate and economic calendars, particularly covering the U.S, UK, Europe, Asia, biotech news, fda calendar, crypto news and covering more than 50 countries in real-time. The company has its headquarters in Washington DC.

References

External links
 

News agencies based in the United States